Rani Mayeum Choying Wangmo Dorji was the mother of Queen Grandmother Ashi Kesang Choden of Bhutan. She was Choying Wangmo Dorji by her marriage. She is best known for designing the Flag of Bhutan. She died in 1994.

Work
Mayeum Choying Wangmo Dorji designed the flag at her daughter's request: Bhutan had been invited to attend the first Asian conference in New Delhi on March 23, 1947, and a flag representing Bhutan was necessitated for the occasion. Mayeum Choying Wangmo Dorji and Bhutan's late prime minister, Lyonchen Jigme Palden Dorji (her son), represented Bhutan at the conference.

Mayeum Choying Wangmo Dorji chose the Dragon as the symbol of the Kingdom of Druk (Bhutan is sometimes referred to as the Kingdom of the Dragon) and the colours yellow and orange for the colours of the flag as the colours of Buddhist religion.

She was deeply religious and would donate large amounts of money to build temples and monasteries.

She was educated privately, and her wedding took place at Bhutan House, Kalimpong, on 5 April 1918.

Patronages 
 President of the Sikkim Education Board.
 Vice-President of Sikkim Research Institute of Tibetology General Council [SRIT] (1964–1965).

Ancestry

References

Bhutanese women in politics
People from Gangtok
1897 births
1994 deaths
Women in Sikkim politics
Flag designers